The Citharinidae, the lutefishes, are a small family of characiform fish. They are freshwater fish native to Africa, and are sufficiently abundant to be significant food fishes.

They are filter feeders.

Genera
The family contains three genera:
Citharidium (monotypic)
Citharinops (monotypic)
Citharinus (6 species)

References 

Characiformes

Ray-finned fish families